In the mathematical field of set theory, an ultrafilter is a maximal proper filter: it is a filter  on a given non-empty set  which is a certain type of non-empty family of subsets of  that is not equal to the power set  of  (such filters are called ) and that is also "maximal" in that there does not exist any other proper filter on  that contains it as a proper subset. 
Said differently, a proper filter  is called an ultrafilter if there exists  proper filter that contains it as a subset, that proper filter (necessarily) being  itself.

Ultrafilters on sets are an important special instance of ultrafilters on partially ordered sets, where the partially ordered set consists of the power set  and the partial order is subset inclusion 

Ultrafilters have many applications in set theory, model theory, and topology.

Definitions

 or : The empty set is not an element of 
If  then either  or its relative complement  is an element of  

Properties (1), (2), and (3) are the defining properties of a  Some authors do not include non-degeneracy (which is property (1) above) in their definition of "filter". However, the definition of "ultrafilter" (and also of "prefilter" and "filter subbase") always includes non-degeneracy as a defining condition. This article requires that all filters be proper although a filter might be described as "proper" for emphasis. 

A filter base is a non-empty family of sets that has the finite intersection property (i.e. all finite intersections are non-empty). The smallest (relative to ) filter containing a given filter subbase is said to be generated by the filter subbase.

Interpretation in the measure theory
An ultrafilter can be viewed as a finitely additive 0-1 valued "measure" (more accurately, a ) on the power set . Such a function is also called a 2-valued morphism. However,  is usually not , and hence does not define a measure in the usual sense.

For a filter  that is not an ultrafilter, one would say  if  and  if  leaving  undefined elsewhere.

With this terminology, the defining properties of a filter can be restated as:
 Any superset of a large set is large set.
 The intersection of any two (or finitely many) large sets is large.
  is a large set (i.e. ).
 The empty set is not large.
Different filters give different notions of "large" sets. For a general filter, there may be subsets of  that are  large nor small (i.e. sets not in  nor its dual ).

Generalization to ultra prefilters

For every set  there exists some set  such that  equals  or  
 Here,  is defined to be the union of all sets in 
 This characterization of " is ultra" does not depend on the set  so mentioning the set  is optional when using the term "ultra."
For  set  (not necessarily even a subset of ) there exists some set  such that  equals  or  
 If  satisfies this condition then so does  superset  In particular, a set  is ultra if and only if  and  contains as a subset some ultra family of sets.

A filter subbase that is ultra is necessarily a prefilter. 

The ultra property can now be used to define both ultrafilters and ultra prefilters: 

An  is a prefilter that is ultra. Equivalently, it is a filter subbase that is ultra.

Equivalently, it is any filter on  that is generated by an ultra prefilter.

Ultra prefilters as maximal prefilters

To characterize ultra prefilters in terms of "maximality," the following relation is needed.

The subordination relationship, i.e.  is a preorder so the above definition of "equivalent" does form an equivalence relation. 
If  then  but the converse does not hold in general. 
However, if  is upward closed, such as a filter, then  if and only if  
Every prefilter is equivalent to the filter that it generates. This shows that it is possible for filters to be equivalent to sets that are not filters.

In particular, if a filter subbase is not also a prefilter, then it is  equivalent to the filter or prefilter that it generates.
Using the following characterization, it is possible to define prefilters (resp. ultra prefilters) using only the concept of filters (resp. ultrafilters) and subordination:

An arbitrary family of sets is a prefilter if and only it is equivalent to a (proper) filter.
An arbitrary family of sets is an ultra prefilter if and only it is equivalent to an ultrafilter.

 is ultra.

There is no prefilter properly subordinate to 
If a (proper) filter  on  satisfies  then 

Characterizations

There are no ultrafilters on the empty set, so it is henceforth assumed that  is nonempty.

for any  either  or 
 is a maximal filter subbase on  meaning that if  is any filter subbase on  then  implies 

 is ultra;
 is generated by an ultra prefilter;
For any subset   or 
 So an ultrafilter  decides for every  whether  is "large" (i.e. ) or "small" (i.e. ).
 is an ideal on 
 In words, a "large" set cannot be a finite union of sets none of which is large.
For any  if  then  or 
For any  if  and  then   or 
 is a maximal filter; that is, if  is a filter on  such that  then  Equivalently,  is a maximal filter if there is no filter  on  that contains  as a proper subset (that is, no filter is strictly finer than ).

Grills and filter-grills

If  then its  is the family 

where  may be written if  is clear from context. 
For example,  and if  then  
If  then  and moreover, if  is a filter subbase then  
The grill  is upward closed in  if and only if  which will henceforth be assumed.  Moreover,  so that  is upward closed in  if and only if  

 if and only if  if and only if

Free or principal

A non-empty family of sets  is called:

  if  and  otherwise (that is, if ).
  if 

Every principal prefilter is fixed, so a principal prefilter  is ultra if and only if  is a singleton set. A singleton set is ultra if and only if its sole element is also a singleton set. 

The next theorem shows that every ultrafilter falls into one of two categories: either it is free or else it is a principal filter generated by a single point. 

Every filter on  that is principal at a single point is an ultrafilter, and if in addition  is finite, then there are no ultrafilters on  other than these.

Examples, properties, and sufficient conditions

The trace  is ultra if and only if it does not contain the empty set. 
Furthermore, at least one of the sets  and  will be ultra (this result extends to any finite partition of ). 
This result is not necessarily true for an infinite family of filters.

The image under a map  of an ultra set  is again ultra and if  is an ultra prefilter then so is  The property of being ultra is preserved under bijections. However, the preimage of an ultrafilter is not necessarily ultra, not even if the map is surjective. For example, if  has more than one point and if the range of  consists of a single point  then  is an ultra prefilter on  but its preimage is not ultra. Alternatively, if  is a principal filter generated by a point in then the preimage of  contains the empty set and so is not ultra.

The elementary filter induced by an infinite sequence, all of whose points are distinct, is  an ultrafilter. If  then  denotes the set consisting all subsets of  having cardinality  and if contains at least  distinct points, then  is ultra but it is not contained in any prefilter. This example generalizes to any integer  and also to  if  contains more than one element. Ultra sets that are not also prefilters are rarely used.

For every  and every  let  If  is an ultrafilter on  then the set of all  such that  is an ultrafilter on

Monad structure

The unit map

sends any element  to the principal ultrafilter given by 

This ultrafilter monad is the codensity monad of the inclusion of the category of finite sets into the category of all sets, which gives a conceptual explanation of this monad.

Similarly, the ultraproduct monad is the codensity monad of the inclusion of the category of finite families of sets into the category of all families of set. So in this sense, ultraproducts are categorically inevitable.

The ultrafilter lemma

The ultrafilter lemma was first proved by Alfred Tarski in 1930.

The ultrafilter lemma is equivalent to each of the following statements:

 For every prefilter on a set  there exists a maximal prefilter on  subordinate to it.
 Every proper filter subbase on a set  is contained in some ultrafilter on 

A consequence of the ultrafilter lemma is that every filter is equal to the intersection of all ultrafilters containing it.

The following results can be proven using the ultrafilter lemma. 
A free ultrafilter exists on a set  if and only if  is infinite. Every proper filter is equal to the intersection of all ultrafilters containing it. Since there are filters that are not ultra, this shows that the intersection of a family of ultrafilters need not be ultra.

Relationships to other statements under ZF

Throughout this section, ZF refers to Zermelo–Fraenkel set theory and ZFC refers to ZF with the Axiom of Choice (AC). The ultrafilter lemma is independent of ZF. That is, there exist models in which the axioms of ZF hold but the ultrafilter lemma does not. There also exist models of ZF in which every ultrafilter is necessarily principal.

Every filter that contains a singleton set is necessarily an ultrafilter and given  the definition of the discrete ultrafilter  does not require more than ZF.  
If  is finite then every ultrafilter is a discrete filter at a point; consequently, free ultrafilters can only exist on infinite sets.  
In particular, if  is finite then the ultrafilter lemma can be proven from the axioms ZF.  
The existence of free ultrafilter on infinite sets can be proven if the axiom of choice is assumed. 
More generally, the ultrafilter lemma can be proven by using the axiom of choice, which in brief states that any Cartesian product of non-empty sets is non-empty. Under ZF, the axiom of choice is, in particular, equivalent to (a) Zorn's lemma, (b) Tychonoff's theorem, (c) the weak form of the vector basis theorem (which states that every vector space has a basis), (d) the strong form of the vector basis theorem, and other statements.  
However, the ultrafilter lemma is strictly weaker than the axiom of choice. 
While free ultrafilters can be proven to exist, it is  possible to construct an explicit example of a free ultrafilter; that is, free ultrafilters are intangible. 
Alfred Tarski proved that under ZFC, the cardinality of the set of all free ultrafilters on an infinite set  is equal to the cardinality of  where  denotes the power set of 
Other authors attribute this discovery to Bedřich Pospíšil (following a combinatorial argument from Fichtenholz, and Kantorovitch, improved by Hausdorff).

Under ZF, the axiom of choice can be used to prove both the ultrafilter lemma and the Krein–Milman theorem; conversely, under ZF, the ultrafilter lemma together with the Krein–Milman theorem can prove the axiom of choice.

Statements that cannot be deduced

The ultrafilter lemma is a relatively weak axiom. For example, each of the statements in the following list can  be deduced from ZF together with  the ultrafilter lemma:

A countable union of countable sets is a countable set.
The axiom of countable choice (ACC).
The axiom of dependent choice (ADC).

Equivalent statements

Under ZF, the ultrafilter lemma is equivalent to each of the following statements:

The Boolean prime ideal theorem (BPIT).
 This equivalence is provable in ZF set theory without the Axiom of Choice (AC).
Stone's representation theorem for Boolean algebras.
Any product of Boolean spaces is a Boolean space.
Boolean Prime Ideal Existence Theorem: Every nondegenerate Boolean algebra has a prime ideal.
Tychonoff's theorem for Hausdorff spaces: Any product of compact Hausdorff spaces is compact.
If  is endowed with the discrete topology then for any set  the product space  is compact.
Each of the following versions of the Banach-Alaoglu theorem is equivalent to the ultrafilter lemma:
Any equicontinuous set of scalar-valued maps on a topological vector space (TVS) is relatively compact in the weak-* topology (that is, it is contained in some weak-* compact set).
The polar of any neighborhood of the origin in a TVS  is a weak-* compact subset of its continuous dual space.
The closed unit ball in the continuous dual space of any normed space is weak-* compact.
 If the normed space is separable then the ultrafilter lemma is sufficient but not necessary to prove this statement.
A topological space  is compact if every ultrafilter on  converges to some limit.
A topological space  is compact if  every ultrafilter on  converges to some limit.
 The addition of the words "and only if" is the only difference between this statement and the one immediately above it.
The Ultranet lemma: Every net has a universal subnet.
A topological space  is compact if and only if every ultranet on  converges to some limit.
 If the words "and only if" are removed then the resulting statement remains equivalent to the ultrafilter lemma.
A convergence space  is compact if every ultrafilter on  converges.
A uniform space is compact if it is complete and totally bounded.
The Stone–Čech compactification Theorem.
<li>Each of the following versions of the compactness theorem is equivalent to the ultrafilter lemma: 
If  is a set of first-order sentences such that every finite subset of  has a model, then  has a model.
If  is a set of zero-order sentences such that every finite subset of  has a model, then  has a model.
The completeness theorem: If  is a set of zero-order sentences that is syntactically consistent, then it has a model (that is, it is semantically consistent).

Weaker statements

Any statement that can be deduced from the ultrafilter lemma (together with ZF) is said to be  than the ultrafilter lemma. 
A weaker statement is said to be  if under ZF, it is not equivalent to the ultrafilter lemma. 
Under ZF, the ultrafilter lemma implies each of the following statements:

The Axiom of Choice for Finite sets (ACF): Given  and a family  of non-empty  sets, their product  is not empty. 
A countable union of finite sets is a countable set.
 However, ZF with the ultrafilter lemma is too weak to prove that a countable union of  sets is a countable set.
The Hahn–Banach theorem.
 In ZF, the Hahn–Banach theorem is strictly weaker than the ultrafilter lemma.
The Banach–Tarski paradox.
 In fact, under ZF, the Banach–Tarski paradox can be deduced from the Hahn–Banach theorem, which is strictly weaker than the Ultrafilter Lemma.
Every set can be linearly ordered.
Every field has a unique algebraic closure.
The Alexander subbase theorem.
Non-trivial ultraproducts exist.
The weak ultrafilter theorem: A free ultrafilter exists on 
 Under ZF, the weak ultrafilter theorem does not imply the ultrafilter lemma; that is, it is strictly weaker than the ultrafilter lemma.
There exists a free ultrafilter on every infinite set; 
 This statement is actually strictly weaker than the ultrafilter lemma. 
 ZF alone does not even imply that there exists a non-principal ultrafilter on  set.

Completeness

The completeness of an ultrafilter  on a powerset is the smallest cardinal κ such that there are κ elements of  whose intersection is not in  The definition of an ultrafilter implies that the completeness of any powerset ultrafilter is at least .

The completeness of a countably complete nonprincipal ultrafilter on a powerset is always a measurable cardinal.

 if and only if 
for every subset 

(If  and  have the same cardinality, the definition can be simplified by fixing  )

It is known that ≡RK is the kernel of ≤RK, i.e., that  if and only if  and

Ultrafilters on ℘(ω) 

There are several special properties that an ultrafilter on  where  extends the natural numbers, may possess, which prove useful in various areas of set theory and topology.
 A non-principal ultrafilter  is called a P-point (or ) if for every partition  of  such that for all   there exists some  such that  is a finite set for each  
 A non-principal ultrafilter  is called Ramsey (or selective) if for every partition  of  such that for all   there exists some  such that  is a singleton set for each 

It is a trivial observation that all Ramsey ultrafilters are P-points. Walter Rudin proved that the continuum hypothesis implies the existence of Ramsey ultrafilters.
In fact, many hypotheses imply the existence of Ramsey ultrafilters, including Martin's axiom. Saharon Shelah later showed that it is consistent that there are no P-point ultrafilters. Therefore, the existence of these types of ultrafilters is independent of ZFC.

P-points are called as such because they are topological P-points in the usual topology of the space  of non-principal ultrafilters. The name Ramsey comes from Ramsey's theorem. To see why, one can prove that an ultrafilter is Ramsey if and only if for every 2-coloring of  there exists an element of the ultrafilter that has a homogeneous color.

See also

Notes

Proofs

References

Bibliography

Further reading

 
 
 

Families of sets
Nonstandard analysis
Order theory